The Federación Ecuatoriana de Atletismo (FEA; Ecuadorian Athletics Federation) is the governing body for athletics in Ecuador.  Current president is Manuel Bravo.

History 
FEA joined CONSUDATLE in 1925.

President until 2012 was Fausto Mendoza.  In October 2012, former long distance runner Franklin Tenorio was elected as new president. However, after only one year, former football player Luis ‘El Chino’ Gómez was elected to replace Tenorio.  After only one week, he already resigned and his vice-president, former middle distance runner and 1990 South American Games 800m silver medallist Manuel Bravo from Cuenca took office as new FEA president.

FEA comprises the associations and provincial committees of Ecuador.

FEA maintains Ecuadorian records in athletics.

Affiliations 
FEA is the national member federation for Ecuador in the following international organisations:
World Athletics
Confederación Sudamericana de Atletismo (CONSUDATLE; South American Athletics Confederation)
Association of Panamerican Athletics (APA)
Asociación Iberoamericana de Atletismo (AIA; Ibero-American Athletics Association)
Ecuadorian National Olympic Committee (Spanish: Comité Olímpico Ecuatoriano)

References

External links 
  (in Spanish)
 FEA on Facebook (in Spanish)
FEA on Twitter (in Spanish)

Ecuador
Atletismo
Athletics in Ecuador
National governing bodies for athletics